is a Japanese football manager.

Coaching career
Taki started his coaching career at the age of 22. He was U18 coach at Cerezo Osaka and had experience as an academy coach at Vissel Kobe and Jubilo Iwata. In 2009, he was brought over to Thailand to become head coach at Thai Honda.

Managerial statistics
.

Honours
 Chiangrai United
 Thailand Champions Cup (1): 2020

References

External links

1972 births
Living people
Japanese football managers
Japanese expatriate football managers
Masami Taki